Tomás Maya Giraldo (12 September 1996) is a Colombian footballer who plays as a left back for Charlotte Independence in USL Championship.

References

1996 births
Living people
Colombian footballers
Association football fullbacks
Categoría Primera A players
Categoría Primera B players
Atlético Nacional footballers
Leones F.C. footballers
Deportivo Pasto footballers
Atlético Huila footballers
Independiente Santa Fe footballers
Cúcuta Deportivo footballers
Footballers from Medellín
Charlotte Independence players
USL League One players